The Jefferson Historic District is a historic district in the small community of Jefferson, Alabama, United States.  The community was founded in 1810.  The district consists of thirteen Greek Revival buildings that were selected for inclusion due to their significance as examples of the pre-Civil War plantation economy of the Deep South.  Some of the buildings included in the district are the Lewis Simmons House (1856), James Aldridge House, Basil Grant House (1855), Dr. James Hildreth House (1848), Frederick Westbrook House (1844), W. L. Kelley House, James Richard Bryan House (1848), Jefferson Methodist Church (1856), and Jefferson Baptist Church (1860).

References

National Register of Historic Places in Marengo County, Alabama
Historic districts in Marengo County, Alabama
Greek Revival architecture in Alabama
Historic districts on the National Register of Historic Places in Alabama